Arsenal Wanderers is a Mauritian football club founded in 1885 based in Arsenal village. They play in the Pamplemousses regional league in Mauritian football. Their home stadium is Stade Anjalay.

Football clubs in Mauritius